Pablo Honey is the debut studio album by the English rock band Radiohead, released on 22 February 1993 in the UK by Parlophone and on 20 April in the US by Capitol Records. It was produced by Sean Slade, Paul Q. Kolderie and Radiohead's co-manager Chris Hufford.

Radiohead formed at Abingdon School in Abingdon, Oxforshire, and signed a recording contract with EMI in 1991. Their debut release, the Drill EP (1992), achieved little success. Pablo Honey was recorded in three weeks at Chipping Norton Recording Studios in Oxfordshire from September to November 1992. The recording was hampered by Radiohead's lack of studio experience.

The singles "Creep", "Anyone Can Play Guitar" and "Stop Whispering" initially made little impact. However, "Creep" gradually gained international radio play, reaching number seven on the UK Singles Chart after it was reissued in 1993. Radiohead embarked on an aggressive promotional tour in the US supporting Belly and PJ Harvey, followed by a European tour supporting James. In May 1995, a live video, Live at the Astoria (1995), was released on VHS.

Pablo Honey reached number 22 on the UK Albums Chart. It was certified gold in the UK in 1994 and triple platinum in 2013. In the US, it was certified platinum in 1995. Pablo Honey received generally favourable reviews, but some found it underdeveloped or derivative. Though it is less acclaimed than Radiohead's later work, some retrospective reviews have been positive and it has appeared in lists of the greatest albums. The members of Radiohead have criticised it, citing weaker songwriting and their studio inexperience. "Creep" remains Radiohead's most successful single.

Background

The members of Radiohead met while attending Abingdon School in Abingdon, Oxforshire. In 1985, they formed , the name referring to their usual rehearsal day in the school's music room. They recorded demo tapes, including Manic Hedgehog, which featured versions of the future Pablo Honey tracks "You", "I Can't" and "Thinking About You".

One demo attracted the attention of a local producer, Chris Hufford. He and his business partner, Bryce Edge, attended a concert at the Jericho Tavern, Oxford; impressed, they became On a Friday's managers. In late 1991, On a Friday signed a six-album recording contract with EMI and changed their name at EMI's request. Their name was taken from the Talking Heads song "Radio Head" from the 1986 album True Stories.

Radiohead released their debut EP, Drill, in 1992. It was produced by Hufford in his studio, Courtyard Studios, in Oxfordshire. It reached number 101 on the UK Singles Chart; the Guardian later described it as an "inauspicious start" that drew little attention. Hufford said producing the EP himself was a mistake, as it created a conflict of interest and generated friction in the studio. He and Edge resolved to find different producers for Radiohead's next recording. As independent labels dominated the indie charts in the UK, and EMI was a major label, Hufford and Edge planned for Radiohead to use American producers and tour aggressively in America, then return to build a following in the UK.

Around this time, the American producers Paul Kolderie and Sean Slade, who had worked with bands including the Pixies and Dinosaur Jr, were in the UK looking for work. The EMI A&R director, Nick Gatfield, gave them a selection of acts to consider. They agreed to produce Radiohead after he played them "Stop Whispering". Steve Albini, another producer who had worked with the Pixies, was also considered, but EMI felt he was too risky; he had not yet worked with major acts such as Nirvana. Kolderie was more impressed by Hufford and Edge than Radiohead, calling them "crafty mothers ... I don't think I've ever met two guys who had more of a plan."

Recording 

Radiohead recorded Pablo Honey at Chipping Norton Studios in Chipping Norton, Oxfordshire. They first attempted to record two songs that EMI was considering for Radiohead's debut single, "Inside My Head" and "Lurgee". They made little progress; Kolderie described Radiohead as "desperately inexperienced", and neither they nor the producers liked the choice of songs. Kolderie said "Inside My Head" was "not very melodic" and lacked the power of Radiohead's other songs. Hufford described the results as "overblown bombastic rock".

During rehearsals, Radiohead unexpectedly played another song, "Creep". They considered it a "throwaway" track, but it impressed the producers. At Kolderie's suggestion, they recorded a take, after which everyone in the studio burst into applause. EMI were persuaded to make "Creep" Radiohead's debut single. According to Kolderie, "everyone [at EMI] who heard Creep just started going insane" and he and Slade were hired to produce the entire album. Radiohead took elements of "Creep" from the 1972 song "The Air That I Breathe". Rondor Music took legal action after "Creep" was released; the songwriters, Albert Hammond and Mike Hazelwood, were given shared royalties and songwriting credits.

Pablo Honey was recorded in three weeks. Kolderie described it as a struggle, and said: "It was their first record and they wanted to be the Beatles, and the mix had to have no reverb, and they had all the ideas they'd ever come up with in 20 years of listening to records." Kolderie noted the band's studio inexperience, and their difficulty in finishing tracks; still, he enjoyed the work due to the small group and joking atmosphere. 

For the introduction to "Anyone Can Play Guitar", Kolderie had everyone in the studio, including the cook, create sounds on guitar. "The idea was to live up to the title: anyone can play guitar," he said. The guitarist Jonny Greenwood used a paintbrush for his part. Radiohead did not like the version of "Lurgee" they recorded with Kolderie and Slade, and used an earlier version, recorded with Hufford at Courtyard, for the album. Kolderie said Pablo Honey was "not cheap", and estimated that it had cost more than £100,000 to record.

Music 
In Pablo Honey, critics found elements of grunge, alternative rock, stadium rock, progressive rock, college rock, post-grunge, and jangle-pop. The album drew comparisons to Nirvana, Dinosaur Jr., Sugar, U2, the Smiths, the Cure, the Who, and the Jam. Stephen Thomas Erlewine of AllMusic described it as a blend of the anthemic rock of U2 with "atmospheric" instrumental passages. O'Brien described it as a "hedonistic" album that "you might put on in an open-top car on a Saturday night going to a party".

The album title comes from a prank call sketch by the Jerky Boys in which the caller poses as the victim's mother and says: "Pablo, honey? Please come to Florida." Yorke said it was appropriate as the band were "mothers' boys". A sample of the sketch appears during the guitar solo on "How Do You".

Release and promotion 
"Creep" was released as the lead Pablo Honey single on 21 September 1992. It initially received little airplay and sold around 6,000 copies, reaching number 78 in the UK Singles Chart. The 1993 singles "Anyone Can Play Guitar" and "Stop Whispering", plus the non-album single "Pop Is Dead", were unsuccessful. While "Anyone Can Play Guitar" and "Pop Is Dead" charted on the UK Singles Chart, "Stop Whispering" gained no traction. Radiohead rerecorded "Stop Whispering" for the US single as they were not happy with the album version; O'Brien said the new version was "more atmospheric", likening it to Joy Division.

In late 1992, Radiohead toured the UK as the support act for Kingmaker and performed at the UK EMI conference in September. They impressed the EMI promoter Carol Baxter, who said: "This funny little band came on and they obviously had something. This was a hideous record company do but Thom gave it everything." That Christmas, NME published a review of a Radiohead performance that dismissed them as "a pitiful, lily-livered excuse for a rock 'n' roll group".

Pablo Honey was released in February 1993 and received little press. It reached number 25 in 1993's UK Albums Chart. However, "Creep" became a hit in Israel, where it was played frequently by the radio DJ Yoav Kutner. In March, Radiohead were invited to Tel Aviv for their first overseas show. Around the same time, "Creep" began receiving airplay on US radio stations and rose to number two on the US Modern Rock chart. By the time Radiohead began their first North American tour in June 1993, the music video for "Creep" was in heavy rotation on MTV. The single reached number 34 on the Billboard Hot 100 chart. Radiohead gave an infamous performance of "Anyone Can Play Guitar" live on MTV Beach House that July. It saw Yorke scream the improvised lyrics “fat, ugly, dead!”, before breaking down on camera and jumping into a pool. Yorke was holding a live microphone and narrowly avoided electrocuting himself. 

"Creep" reached number seven on the UK Singles Chart when EMI rereleased it in September 1993. That month, Radiohead performed "Creep" on the British music programme Top of the Pops and as the first musical guests on the American talk show Late Night with Conan O'Brien. EMI's American arm Capitol wanted to continue promoting Pablo Honey and build on the momentum. Radiohead declined an offer to tour the US in support of Duran Duran; their managers felt they could earn more credibility by supporting Belly. They also opened for PJ Harvey in New York City and Los Angeles. The band struggled with the tour; Yorke disliked dealing with American music journalists and had tired of the songs. Radiohead appeared in promotional material they later regretted, such as fashion shoots for Iceberg jeans and the magazine Interview. According to Radiohead's agent, the promotional work triggered "a lot of soul-searching about why they were in a group at all". Jonny Greenwood said they "spent a year being jukeboxes ... We felt in a creative stasis because we couldn't release anything new."

The American tour was followed by a European tour supporting James. Afterwards, Radiohead cancelled an appearance at Reading Festival after Yorke became ill; he told NME, "Physically I'm completely fucked and mentally I've had enough." According to some reports, EMI gave Radiohead six months to "get sorted" or be dropped. EMI's A&R head Keith Wozencroft later denied this, saying: "Experimental rock music was getting played and had commercial potential. People voice different paranoias, but for the label [Radiohead] were developing brilliantly from Pablo Honey." Kolderie credited the Pablo Honey tours for turning Radiohead "into a tight band".

In the UK, Pablo Honey was certified gold in April 1994, platinum in June 1997 and triple platinum in July 2013. In the US, it was certified gold in September 1993 and platinum in September 1995. On 13 May 1995, a live video featuring performances of many Pablo Honey and Bends songs, Live at the Astoria (1995), was released on VHS.

Critical reception

Pablo Honey failed to make a critical impact upon its initial release. NMEs John Harris referred to Radiohead as "one of rock's brightest hopes". Harris said the track "How Do You?" "breaks the [album's] momentum... horribly", but described Pablo Honey as "satisfying" despite its flaws. NME later named it the 35th-best album of the year. Remarking that "British teenagerhood has never been grumpier," Q felt that it was a "good" album with moments that rivalled Nirvana, Dinosaur Jr. and Sugar.

In the United States, "Creep" drew parallels with Nirvana, with some describing Radiohead as the "British Nirvana". Billboard said the lyrics had "enough bite to make it on their own" despite the U2 comparisons. In a mixed review, Mario Mundoz of the Los Angeles Times wrote that it "doesn't really deliver anything you haven't heard before [...] though, it does offer clever lyrics and good hooks." Robert Christgau of The Village Voice did not recommend the album, but named "Creep" a "choice cut". Rolling Stone wrote that its charm originates from its guitar work, song structures, melodies, and choruses that invoke a "pop appeal".

Legacy

Although Pablo Honey did not receive the acclaim of Radiohead's later albums, it has received praise in retrospective coverage. According to Stephen Thomas Erlewine of AllMusic, the songwriting does not always match Radiohead's sound, but when it does, it achieves "a rare power that is both visceral and intelligent". Kenny EG Perry of NME described the album as "the sound of one of the best bands of this or any other generation playing the music that taught them all their good early lessons". Clash said that it "points towards everything that [Radiohead] would go on to be".

In a 2008 review, Al Spicer of BBC Music described Pablo Honey as Radiohead's "exploration of suburban, adolescent self-awareness" and "one of rock's most impressive debuts." In 2009, PopMatters Mehan Jahasuriya criticised Pablo Honey as "a hodgepodge of half-baked grunge, jangle-pop and stadium-ready alternative rock ... nearly indistinguishable from other early '90s college rock throwaways, save for a few hints of greatness".

After the success of "Creep", Radiohead grew to resent it. In 1993, Yorke said: "It's like it's not our song any more ... It feels like we're doing a cover." The success almost led to Radiohead's breakup. Their frustration with "Creep" and Pablo Honey influenced their second album, The Bends (1995). The album title, a term for decompression sickness, references Radiohead's rapid rise to fame; Yorke said "we just came up too fast". Though Radiohead achieved greater commercial and critical success with later albums, "Creep" remains their most successful single.

In 2007, Pitchfork wrote that, with Pablo Honey, "Radiohead didn't so much ride the coattails of grunge to mass success as stumble over them, and they've been apologising for it ever since." In 1996, the bassist, Colin Greenwood, said, "I'd give [Pablo Honey] a seven out of 10 – not bad for an album recorded in just two and a half weeks." In 1997, O'Brien said it was derivative of Dinosaur Jr. and the Pixies. He described it as "a collection of our greatest hits as an unsigned band". Jonny Greenwood said in 1998 that it "lacked freedom", and was hindered by the band's fear and inexperience. O'Brien said in 2020 that Pablo Honey was "pretty shit [...] but we worked hard and became good. That's one of the things I've held onto: you don't have to have all the answers straight away."

Accolades 
In 1998, Pablo Honey was voted the 100th best album of all time in a poll held by Virgin and 61st in a poll by Q. The journalist Colin Larkin placed it 301st in the third edition of All Time Top 1000 Albums (2000). As part of its 2014 list of "1010 Songs You Must Own", Q included "Lurgee" and "Blow Out" in a list of 20 essential lesser-known Radiohead songs. In 2006, Classic Rock and Metal Hammer named Pablo Honey one of the 20 greatest albums of 1993. In 2008, Blender ranked it 82nd in its list of "100 Albums You Must Own".

Reissues 
Radiohead left EMI after their contract ended in 2003. In 2007, EMI released Radiohead Box Set, a compilation of albums recorded while Radiohead were signed to EMI, including Pablo Honey. In 2009, EMI reissued Pablo Honey in a "Collector's Edition" with the Drill EP tracks, B-sides and alternative takes. Radiohead had no input into the reissues and the music was not remastered.

In February 2013, Parlophone was bought by Warner Music Group (WMG). In April 2016, as a result of an agreement with the trade group Impala, WMG transferred Radiohead's back catalogue to XL Recordings. The EMI reissues, released without Radiohead's consent, were removed from streaming services. In May 2016, XL reissued Radiohead's back catalogue on vinyl, including Pablo Honey.

Track listing

Personnel
Radiohead
 Colin Greenwood – bass guitar
 Jonny Greenwood – lead guitar, piano, organ
 Ed O'Brien – guitar, backing vocals
 Philip Selway – drums
 Thom Yorke – vocals, guitar

Production
 Chris Blair – mastering
 Chris Hufford – production, engineering 
 Paul Q. Kolderie – production, engineering , mixing
 Sean Slade – production, engineering , mixing

Design
 Icon – design
 Lisa Bunny Jones – paintings
 Tom Sheehan – photography

Charts

Weekly charts

Year-end charts

Certifications and sales

References

Bibliography

External links

1993 debut albums
Radiohead albums
Parlophone albums
Capitol Records albums
Albums produced by Paul Q. Kolderie
Albums produced by Sean Slade